Taekwondo was a demonstration sport at the 1988 Summer Olympics in Seoul.  It was the first time that the sport was included in the Olympic program; it would become an official sport twelve years later at the 2000 Games.  A total of 120 men and 62 women from 35 nations competed in eight weight classes.  Each event featured a single-elimination tournament to determine the winner.  Competition was held at the Changchung Gymnasium from September 17 to 20.  Fighters from the host nation of South Korea won nine of the sixteen events.

Men's events

Finweight (–50 kg)

Flyweight (50–54 kg)

Bantamweight (55–58 kg)

Featherweight (58–64 kg)

Lightweight (64–70 kg)

Welterweight (70–76 kg)

Middleweight (76–83 kg)

Heavyweight (+83 kg)

Women's events

Finweight (–43 kg)

Flyweight (43–47 kg)

Bantamweight (47–51 kg)

Featherweight (51–55 kg)

Lightweight (55–60 kg)

Welterweight (60–65 kg)

Middleweight (65–70 kg)

Heavyweight (+70 kg)

Abbreviations
DIS — Opponent did not participate in weigh-in
KO — Won by Knock-Out 
INJ — Won by opponent Injury 
PTS — Won by Points
RSC — Won by Referee Stopping the Contest 
SUP — Won by Superiority 
WDR — Won by opponent Withdrawal

Medals

References
 

1988 Summer Olympics events
1988
Olympic demonstration sports
1988 in taekwondo
Men's events at the 1988 Summer Olympics
Women's events at the 1988 Summer Olympics